Beat The House is an American reality series that aired on HGTV. It is hosted by real estate agents JoJo Jones and Christopher Kromer, and centers upon both realtors competing for the same customers. The show's began airing on January 7, 2014.

Premise
The show's premise centers upon the show's two hosts, JoJo Jones and Christopher Kromer, approaching a prospective customer that is ready to purchase a house from a third real estate agent. The hosts then show the customer two additional homes, giving them the option to remain with their previous choice or to choose between the houses that the two hosts have presented.

Episodes

Reception
Bloomberg Businessweek wrote a mixed review for the show, criticizing it for being overly familiar to similarly themed real estate reality shows while stating that it does introduce some new elements in that the show "capitalizes on a specifically modern fear—the recently coined "fear of missing out".

References

External links
 

HGTV original programming
2010s American reality television series
2014 American television series debuts
2014 American television series endings